Gedikpınarı  is a small village in Silifke district of Mersin Province, Turkey. The population of the village is only 65 as of 2012. Main economic activities of the village are farming and animal breeding.

References

Villages in Silifke District